Ricardo de la Espriella Toral (born 5 September 1934) is a Panamanian politician who was the President of Panama from 31 July 1982 to 13 February 1984.

Early career
Ricardo de la Espriella is a Stanford-trained economist. Espriella was the general manager of National Bank of Panama from 1970 to 1978, when he became Vice President in 1978, when the all-powerful National Guard pressed then President Aristides Royo, whom they considered to be a dangerous leftist, to resign before his term ended in 1984.  

Since de la Espriella was head of the National Finance Commission before Royos's resignation.  Being a competent financial manager, he posed no threat to the dominant influence of the National Guard, and wasted no time in referring to them as "a partner in power". Thus, de la Espriella was a type of "puppet" president and remained so under the brutal Manuel Noriega (Panama's first Chief of Intelligence, and then guard commander when Rubén Darío Paredes resigned that title to start his own electoral campaign).

Presidency
When de la Espriella took the oath as Interim President, the then-Commander Paredes immediately decreed that certain Panamanian newspapers be shut down, including La Prensa, which had become the country's conscience.  Paredes ordered certain hoodlums to attack the newspaper, smashing the windows, typewriters, the head of a pressman, and an unfortunate unintended victim – the director of the Central American Institute of Business Administration, who had just come by with a press release from his institution.  His suit and tie caused him to be mistaken for the "La Prensa" director.

In August 1982, de la Espriella formed a new cabinet that included independents and members of the Liberal Party and the PRD; Jorge Illueca, Royo's foreign minister, became the new vice president.  Meanwhile, Colonel Armando Contreras became chief of staff of the National Guard, until December 1982, when Noriega took over that position.

The country had only a "democratic façade."  President Ronald Reagan wrote de la Espriella a response "thank you" letter on "the situation in Central America", dated 26 July 1983, regarding a letter received by him from de la Espriella and the presidents of Colombia, Mexico and Venezuela, written regarding a meeting held by the four in Cancún on 17 July 1983.  Reagan's "thank you" also outlined 4 points the United States expected the "Contadora Four" (as they were called) to follow.

De la Espriella remained public and appeared in Time magazine, Newsweek, and other magazines - one of which printed a 1983 photo of him sitting next to then-Vice President George H. W. Bush who sat alongside a young, uniformed Manuel Noriega.  If a picture is worth a thousand words, de la Espriella not only appeared as president, but as a "mediator" or "interpreter of events" whenever Noriega hovered.

But by 1984, de la Espriella was pressured by the National Defense Forces, according to close friends, to reorganize his Cabinet to include supporters of an official candidate.  Publicity speculated he stepped down in order to keep the election from being unfairly slanted, or most likely, driven out by the Forces under personal threat.  In In the Time of Tyrants by R.M. Koster & Guillermo Sanchez, 1990, W.W. Norton & Co., N.Y., pages 302-303 state (not verbatim):   " ...de la Espriella was given a list of replacements for his cabinet, but balked at naming them... On 13 February, he was with his family in Chiriquí Province.  Noriega sent a plane to bring him to an urgent council of state in the capital, at which only he and Colonel Díaz Herrera were present.  Díaz Herrera talked while Noriega looked on.  Why hadn't de la Espriella made the appointments? "They weren't good for the country", de la Espriella replied, and that was surely true...but sixteen years had passed since the good of the country had mattered a fig in the decisions of the Panamanian leaders, and that hadn't bothered de la Espriella before.  So he wanted to end his term with a few scraps of dignity, but that wasn't to be and he should have known it. "You should think of your family", said Herrera..."do you know where they are?" "

Ricardo de la Espriella resigned immediately.

References 

1934 births
Living people
Presidents of Panama
Vice presidents of Panama
Panamanian bankers
People from Panama City